Kemenyffy is a surname. Notable people with the surname include:

Steven Kemenyffy (born 1943), American artist 
Susan Hale Kemenyffy (born 1941), American artist